The 1922 Tasmanian state election was held on 10 June 1922. Since the last election, the Country Party had formed and counted a number of Nationalist MHAs among its members.

Retiring Members

Nationalist
Sir Elliott Lewis MHA (Denison)
Robert Sadler MHA (Bass)

House of Assembly
Sitting members are shown in bold text. Tickets that elected at least one MHA are highlighted in the relevant colour. Successful candidates are indicated by an asterisk (*).

Bass
Six seats were up for election. The Labor Party was defending two seats. The Nationalist Party was defending four seats.

Darwin
Six seats were up for election. The Labor Party was defending three seats. The Nationalist Party was defending two seats, although Edward Hobbs was running for the Country Party. Independent MHA Joshua Whitsitt was defending one seat.

Denison
Six seats were up for election. The Labor Party was defending three seats. The Nationalist Party was defending three seats.

Franklin
Six seats were up for election. The Labor Party was defending three seats, although David Dicker was running as an independent. The Nationalist Party was defending three seats, although William Dixon was running for the Country Party.

Wilmot
Six seats were up for election. The Labor Party was defending two seats. The Nationalist Party was defending four seats, although Ernest Blyth was running for the Country Party.

See also
 Members of the Tasmanian House of Assembly, 1919–1922
 Members of the Tasmanian House of Assembly, 1922–1925

References
Tasmanian Parliamentary Library

Candidates for Tasmanian state elections